The 2018–19 A-League was the 42nd season of national level soccer in Australia, and the 14th since the establishment of the A-League in 2004. The regular season commenced on 19 October 2018 and concluded on 28 April 2019. The play-offs began on 3 May 2019 and ended with the Grand Final on 19 May 2019.  Sydney FC defeated Perth Glory in the Grand Final.

Clubs

Personnel and kits

Managerial changes

Foreign players

The following do not fill a Visa position:
1Those players who were born and started their professional career abroad but have since gained Australian citizenship (and New Zealand citizenship, in the case of Wellington Phoenix);
2Australian citizens (and New Zealand citizens, in the case of Wellington Phoenix) who have chosen to represent another national team;
3Injury Replacement Players, or National Team Replacement Players;
4Guest Players (eligible to play a maximum of fourteen games)

Salary cap exemptions and captains

Transfers

Regular season

League table

Results

Finals series

Elimination-finals

Semi-finals

Grand Final

Season statistics

Attendances

By club
These are the attendance records of each of the teams at the end of the home and away season. The table does not include finals series attendances.

By round

Club membership

Scoring

Top scorers

Hat-tricks

Own goals

Clean sheets

Discipline
During the season each club is given fair play points based on the number of cards they received in games. A yellow card is worth 1 point, a second yellow card is worth 2 points, and a red card is worth 3 points. At the annual awards night, the club with the fewest  points wins the Fair Play Award.

Player
 Most yellow cards: 11
 Alex Rufer (Wellington Phoenix)
 Most red cards: 2
 Éric Bauthéac (Brisbane Roar)
 Kye Rowles (Central Coast Mariners)

Club
 Most yellow cards: 67
Wellington Phoenix
 Most red cards: 7
Central Coast Mariners

Awards

Monthly awards
The A-League Goal of the Month is an award that recognises the player who is deemed to have scored the best A-League goal each month of the season. The winner is chosen by an online public vote through the A-League website.

Annual awards
The NAB Young Footballer of the Year Award was awarded to the finest performance of an under-23 player from Australia or New Zealand throughout the season.

The following end of the season awards were announced at the 2018–19 Dolan Warren Awards night on 13 May 2019.
 Johnny Warren Medal – Roy Krishna, Wellington Phoenix
 NAB Young Footballer of the Year – Chris Ikonomidis, Perth Glory
 Nike Golden Boot Award – Roy Krishna, Wellington Phoenix (18 goals)
 Goalkeeper of the Year – Filip Kurto, Wellington Phoenix
 Coach of the Year – Tony Popovic, Perth Glory
 Fair Play Award – Sydney FC
 Referee of the Year – Shaun Evans
 Goal of the Year – Éric Bauthéac, Brisbane Roar (Central Coast Mariners v Brisbane Roar, 22 February 2019)

See also

 2018–19 Adelaide United FC season
 2018–19 Brisbane Roar FC season
 2018–19 Central Coast Mariners FC season
 2018–19 Melbourne City FC season
 2018–19 Melbourne Victory FC season
 2018–19 Newcastle Jets FC season
 2018–19 Perth Glory FC season
 2018–19 Sydney FC season
 2018–19 Wellington Phoenix FC season
 2018–19 Western Sydney Wanderers FC season

Notes

References

 
1
1
A-League Men seasons